

François Henri Hallopeau (17 January 1842, Paris – 20 March 1919, Paris) was a French dermatologist. He studied medicine under Alfred Vulpian and Sigismond Jaccoud. He co-founded and was secretary general of the Société Française de dermatologie et de syphiligraphie. He became a member of the Académie de Médecine in 1893.

He coined the medical term trichotillomania in 1889. He also coined the word antibiotique in 1871 to describe a substance opposed to the development of life. 

Selman Waksman was later credited with coining the word antibiotic to describe such compounds that were derived from other living organisms, such as penicillin.

Terms
 Recessive dystrophic epidermolysis bullosa (also known as Hallopeau-Siemens syndrome)
 Pemphigus vegetans of Hallopeau

Papers

See also
Timeline of tuberous sclerosis

References

Further reading 
 

1842 births
1919 deaths
French dermatologists